A list of Japanese films that were first released in 2017.

Highest-grossing films
The following is a list of the 10 highest-grossing Japanese films at the Japanese box office during 2017.

Film releases

January – March

April - June

July - September

October - December

See also
 2017 in Japan
 2017 in Japanese television
 List of 2017 box office number-one films in Japan

References

External links

Film
2017
Lists of 2017 films by country or language